Trini Lopez at PJ's is the debut, live album by singer and guitarist Trini Lopez, released in 1963 on Reprise Records. Many of the tracks are folk music songs. The record was a result of Don Costa hearing him perform at PJ's nightclub, and signing him to his new Reprise record label. The club floor was miked to get the crowd reaction on the record, as the producer and Frank Sinatra wanted the "live" experience to come across in the recording. The cover shows Lopez with his Barney Kessel guitar, outside the nightclub. The album peaked at #2 on the Billboard 200 in August 1963 where it remained for 6 weeks.

Singles
The album includes a cover of "If I Had a Hammer", which reached number one in 36 countries (No. 3 in the United States). It sold over one million copies, and was awarded a gold disc. Lopez also performs a version of the traditional Mexican song "La Bamba". This version was later re-issued as a single in 1966.

Track listing

Side one
"A-me-ri-ca"
"If I Had a Hammer"
"Bye Bye Blackbird"
"Cielito Lindo"
"This Land Is Your Land"
"What'd I Say"

Side two
"La Bamba"
"Granada"
"Gotta Travel On" - (Billy Grammer) (medley, tracks 3-7)
"Down by the Riverside"
"Marianne"
"When the Saints Go Marching In"
"Volare"
"Unchain My Heart"

Musicians
Lopez - guitar, vocals
Mickey Jones - drums
Dick Brant - bass guitar (credited on the album, reportedly cut from the final recording)

Production 
 Recorded at PJ's nightclub, West Hollywood, California.

Other contributors
 Liner notes by Mike Connolly of The Hollywood Reporter
 Cover photo - Marko

References

Trini Lopez at PJ's, Trini Lopez. Reprise Records R-6093 (1963)

1963 live albums
Reprise Records live albums
Trini Lopez albums
Albums produced by Don Costa
1963 debut albums
Live albums by American artists